The 1954 UCI Road World Championships took place in Solingen, West Germany.

Events Summary

References

 
UCI Road World Championships by year
W
R
R